Rajesh Jais (born 6 September 1969) is an Indian film actor, known for first daily soap of india Shanti (1994),  Sonu Ke Titu Ki Sweety (2018), Rab Ne Bana Di Jodi (2008), Rocket Singh (2009), Airlift (2016) and Raazi (2018), Raman Raghav 2.0 (2016), Missing (2018), Life Partner (2009), Why Cheat India (2019), Indoo Ki Jawani (2020), Roohi (2021) and most talked about webseries Scam 1992, Paatal Lok, Panchayat, Rudrakal etc.

Early life
He spent his childhood in Ranchi. His family had migrated from Kandahar to Sukhdeo Nagar in Ranchi after partition of India. His father was in Airforce. He completed his matriculation from Guaridutt Mandeliya school and graduation from Marwari college, Ranchi. He was NCC Airforce Cadet and Scout in college. He studied in National School of Drama from 1988 to 1991.

Career

He was a journalist in Ranchi Express. He was a theatre actor, Post Graduated from National School of Drama, New Delhi. He came to Mumbai in 1990s. His first television series was Main Vi Detective. His initial most noted appearance was in the first daily soap of India, Shanti as Nanu in 1994. Acted as principal characters in more than 35 prominent serials He also acted in improvisation based series 'Manch Masala'(Original show 'whose Line is it anyway') of Siddharth Basu (Kaun Banega Crorepati fame).

He has done more than 40 ad films of big National and International brands like; Samsung, Maruti, Pepsodent, Bajaj Capital, Saffola, Subway, Tech Mahindra, Whirlpool, TCS, Bingo, Hyundai, Dollar, UFO, Bandhan Bank, LIC, DSN, Reliance Big, Birla White, 7'o'clock, Phoenix, Indian Oil etc.

His memorable appearances were in Shanti, Sorry Meri Lorry, Zanjeeren, Jai Jai Tridev, Trikaal, Is Pyaar ko kya Naam du, Chacha Choudhary, Great Experiments, Shanno ki Shaadi, Dishaayen, Kya Mast Hai Life, Sapno ke Bhanwar Me, Malini Iyer, Kagaar, Shastri Sisters and many more.

Recently, He is seen as SBI Manager in 'Scam 92- on Sony liv. He also appeared in Amazon prime's webseries 'Pataallok','Panchayat' and Rudrakal on Disney hotstar.

He also acted in movies like 'Matrubhoomi: A Nation Without Women', Sonu ke Titu ki Sweety (2016), Rocket Singh and Joggers Park has won him the attention of the viewers.  He acted in films such as Rab Ne Bana Di Jodi (2008), Rocket Singh (2009), Airlift (2016) and Raazi (2018), Missing (2018),  Life Partner (2009), Why Cheat India(2019) Indu ki jawani (2019), Roohi (2020) and many more...

He also performs as Narrator and Sangtarash in 1st Indian Broadway styled mega Musical 'Mughal E Azam' (The cult film) directed by Feroz Khan, mostly in abroad, Mumbai and Delhi.

Filmography

Television

Awards and nominations

References

External links

Living people
Indian male stage actors
Indian male film actors
Indian male television actors
21st-century Indian male actors
1969 births